Brighton Town Hall stands on Bartholomew Square in Brighton, East Sussex, England. The town hall contains a number of police cells which were in use until the 1960s, and which now form the Old Police Cells Museum. The town hall is a Grade II listed building.

History
The site occupied by the town hall was once the location of the Priory of Bartholomew, which was damaged by French raiders in June 1514. The priory disappeared completely as a result of the Chantries Act 1547 and the site was then used as a market place in the 17th century. The current building was commissioned to replace a previous town hall built on the western side of Market Street in 1727.

The foundation stone for the new building was laid by Thomas Read Kemp, a local property developer who had encouraged the initiative, in April 1830. The new building, which was designed by Thomas Cooper in the Greek Revival style and built at a cost of £60,000, was officially opened in 1832. The design included, on each side, a four-storey portico with a Doric order columns below and an Ionic order columns above, with a pediment on top. The local police force, which was formed in 1838, established a police station in the building and police cells in the basement. On 12 and 13 November 1858, the author Charles Dickens gave a reading of A Christmas Carol to a large audience at the town hall and, on 16 September 1861, the opera singer Adelina Patti performed there during a concert given by the composer and pianist Wilhelm Kuhe.

The building was the venue for the quarter sessions until hearings moved to the Law Courts in Edward Street in 1967.

In March 2003 the building was entered by activists, notionally protesting at the start of the Iraq War, who caused significant damage to computers and furniture.

The former police cells which had been used for storage since Brighton Police had moved to new facilities in John Street in 1965, were opened up as a museum on 4 May 2005.

Services
Three rooms within the town hall are licensed for wedding ceremonies; these are the Regency Room, The Fitzherbert Room and the Council Chamber. The city's register office is located in the building and the prison cells can be visited as part of the Old Police Cells Museum.

See also
Grade II listed buildings in Brighton and Hove: A–B

References

Buildings and structures in Brighton and Hove
City and town halls in East Sussex
Government buildings completed in 1832